USS LST–542 was the lead ship of her class of tank landing ships built for the United States Navy during World War II. She was later named USS Chelan County (LST-542) for the county in Washington, the only U.S. Naval vessel to bear the name. The LST-542-class was built with a water-distilling plant and heavier armament than the earlier , which slightly decreased their payload.

LST-542 was laid down on 29 November 1943 at Evansville, Indiana by the Missouri Valley Bridge & Iron Company; launched on 28 January 1944; sponsored by Mrs. Robert C. Dean; and commissioned on 29 February 1944.

Service history
During World War II, LST-542 was assigned to the European Theater and participated in the invasion of Normandy in June 1944. Following the war, LST-542 saw service as a part of the Amphibious Force, U.S. Atlantic Fleet.

She was named Chelan County (LST-542) on 1 July 1955. The ship was decommissioned in 1956 and struck from the Naval Vessel Register on 1 November 1959.
 
LST-542 earned one battle star for World War II service.

References

See also
 List of United States Navy LSTs

LST-542-class tank landing ships
World War II amphibious warfare vessels of the United States
Cold War amphibious warfare vessels of the United States
Chelan County, Washington
Ships built in Evansville, Indiana
1944 ships